Rakova Noga is a village in the municipalities of Istočni Stari Grad (Republika Srpska) and Ilijaš, Bosnia and Herzegovina.

Demographics 
According to the 2013 census, its population was 2, both Serbs living in the Ilijaš part, thus none in the Istočni Stari Grad.

References

Populated places in Ilijaš
Populated places in Istočni Stari Grad